Langston High School may refer to:

Langston High School (Tennessee) in Johnson City, Tennessee established in 1893 and named for John Mercer Langston
Langston High School (Arkansas) in Hot Springs, Arkansas where Ike Thomas, Mamie Phipps Clark and Edith Mae Irby Jones went
John M. Langston High School in Danville, Virginia named for John Mercer Langston and where C. B. Claiborne went

Langston Hughes High School
Langston Hughes High School in Fairburn, Georgia